A person with non-domiciled status, sometimes called a 'non-dom', is a person living in the United Kingdom who is considered under British law to be domiciled (i.e. with their permanent home) in another country. Non-doms pay UK tax to the UK government like all other UK residents. Tax status is determined by residence and domicile; nationality is irrelevant. A British citizen who has established a permanent home abroad may reside for a time in Britain and be taxed as non-domiciled.

Non-domiciled status can either be acquired from one's parents, which is known as a 'domicile of origin', or by abandoning one's domicile of origin and demonstrating the intention to reside outside of the UK indefinitely. According to the official government page, "UK residents who have their permanent home ('domicile') outside the UK may not have to pay UK tax on foreign income."

In the 2012/13 tax year more than 113,000 people in the UK claimed non-dom status. The Independent estimated that there were about 116,000 in 2013, an increase of 33,000 since 1997.

The issue of non-doms came to public attention in 2010, and led to the passage of Constitutional Reform and Governance Act 2010, which provided, among other things, that a person not domiciled in the UK could not serve in the House of Lords. Some non-domiciled Lords gave up their seats in order to maintain their tax status.

Notable "non-doms"
Prominent non-doms include:

 Roman Abramovich
 Arpad Busson
 James Caan
 Richard Caring
 Mark Carney, former Governor of the Bank of England
 Sudhir Choudhrie
 Sir Ronald Cohen
 Ben Goldsmith
 Stuart Gulliver, CEO of HSBC
 Jonathan Harmsworth, 4th Viscount Rothermere
 António Horta Osório, CEO of Lloyds Banking Group
 John McFarlane, former Chairman of Barclays
 Lakshmi Mittal
 Akshata Murthy, wife of Prime Minister Rishi Sunak
 Sir Christopher Ondaatje
 Sir Anwar Pervez
 David Potter
 Sigrid Rausing
 Doug Richard
 Pascal Soriot, CEO of AstraZeneca
 Mark Wilson, CEO of Aviva

Those who resigned from the House of Lords over the issue include Raj Bagri, Baron Bagri, Baroness Lydia Dunn, Norman Foster, Lord Laidlaw and Alistair McAlpine, Baron McAlpine of West Green.

Former "non-doms"
 Zac Goldsmith - Pressured by David Cameron into giving up the non-domiciled status he acquired from his father
 Jemima Goldsmith
 Sir Gulam Noon - gave up non-domiciled status in order to become assistant Treasurer to the Labour party
 Lord Paul - gave up non-dom status in 2010 to retain seat in the House of Lords

Lord Ashcroft was arguably the most prominent of these. After some publicity and political pressure, in 2010 he gave up his non-dom status in order to stay in the House of Lords. However, in 2015 he retired as a working peer, which the Financial Times pointed out would allow him to "revive his non-domiciled tax status".

References

British nationality law
Non-domiciled status in the UK
Taxation in the United Kingdom